Aleksander Mysiak (1908–1991) was a Polish football player, a midfielder, who in the late 1920s and early 1930s represented both Cracovia and the Polish National Team. With Cracovia, he twice won the Championships of Poland (1930, 1932), altogether playing in 230 games. As a member of the National Team, Mysiak was fielded in 17 international matches. His career ended suddenly at the age of 26; rumor has it that this was due to his wife's dislike of football.

References

External links
Aleksander Mysiak in KS Cracovia online encyclopedia

1908 births
1986 deaths
Polish footballers
MKS Cracovia (football) players
Poland international footballers
Footballers from Kraków
Association football midfielders